In Colorado, State Highway 270 may refer to:
Interstate 270 (Colorado), the only Colorado highway numbered 270 since 1968
Colorado State Highway 270 (1938-1953) west of Colorado Springs